These are the nearly 3,000 victims of the September 11 attacks, as they appear inscribed at the National September 11 Memorial & Museum in New York.

References

External links

 
 
 

 
2001 deaths
September 11 attacks
September 11 attacks